The 2017–18 season was Exeter City's 116th year in existence and their sixth consecutive season in League Two, where they finished in fourth place. The Grecians progressed to and lost their second consecutive promotion play-off final City progressed to the third round of the FA Cup after beating 8th-tier Heybridge Swifts in the first round, and fellow League Two side Forest Green Rovers in a second round replay. Exeter were knocked out in the third round by Premier League side West Bromwich Albion. The Grecians were knocked out of the EFL Cup in the First Round, losing at home to Charlton Athletic, and were also eliminated in the regionalised first round (group stage) of the EFL Trophy, finishing bottom of Southern Group D.

The season covers the period from 1 July 2017 to 30 June 2018.

Transfers

Transfers in

Transfers out

Loans in

Loans out
Note: this section may be inaccurate, due to incomplete information released by the club about loans out.

Pre-season
Exeter City played five pre-season fixtures in July 2017, all away from home at teams based in Somerset and Dorset. The club's pre-season schedule began with a trip to Twerton Park, where they faced off against Bath City for the Brian Lomax SD Cup – an annual fixture held between two supporter-owned clubs.

There were no pre-season friendlies at St James Park due to redevelopment work taking place over the summer.

Brian Lomax SD Cup

Friendlies

Competitions

League Two

League table

Matches
The fixtures for the 2017–18 season were announced on 21 June 2017.

August

September

October

November

December

January

February

March

April

May

League Two play-offs

FA Cup
On 16 October 2017, the Grecians were drawn at home to Heybridge Swifts in the first round of the FA Cup.

City eventually overcame the Swifts 3–1 with all the goals being scored in the final 45 minutes after an uneventful first half. Jayden Stockley scored a quick brace before Heybridges' Sam Bantick scored a consolation. Liam McAlinden then sealed the win for Exeter in the 86th minute. The following day, the Grecians were drawn away to Forest Green Rovers for the Second Round.

Prolific goalscorer Christian Doidge netted for Rovers after 26 minutes, the only goal in the first half. Grecians skipper Jordan Moore-Taylor equalised in the 58th minute and Jayden Stockley scored not long after to give City a 2–1 lead. However, Forest Green equalised through Scott Laird in the 88th minute and Doidge scored again in the 92nd to turn the game on its head. To make the game's conclusion even more dramatic, Stockley scored his second goal in the 94th minute as the match finished 3–3.

The Grecians achieved an incredible comeback from a goal and a man down to triumph 2–1 in the replay to set a Third Round tie against Premier League side West Bromwich Albion. Forest Green had opened the scoring with a 30th-minute penalty scored by Christian Doidge. City were down to ten men after 63 minutes due to Jordan Tillson's second yellow card. However, Rovers conceded a penalty only ten minutes later and Pierce Sweeney converted. The score was 1–1 at the end of 90 minutes, and the next significant event was a second sending off, this time the culprit being Rovers defender Manny Monthé, leaving both teams with ten men. Jayden Stockley scored the winner in the 115th minute, netting his 11th goal of the season.

City's third round tie against West Bromwich Albion started very poorly, conceding after only 75 seconds after Christy Pym failed to keep Salomón Rondón's long-distance shot out. The Baggies scored again in the 25th minute through Jay Rodriguez. The BBC match report attributed both goals to mistakes by Danny Seaborne.

EFL Cup
On 16 June 2017, Exeter City were drawn at home to Charlton Athletic in the first round of the EFL Cup. Lee Holmes opened the scoring for the Grecians after 54 minutes by netting a free kick. However, goals by Billy Clarke and Regan Charles-Cook saw the Reds eliminated in the First Round for the first time since 2014.

EFL Trophy
City were placed in the Southern Group D, alongside the other two southwesternmost EFL League One and Two teams Plymouth Argyle and Yeovil Town. The Chelsea F.C. Academy was announced to be the other side in the group. On 13 July 2017, it was revealed that the Grecians would play Chelsea and Yeovil Town at home and Plymouth Argyle away.

City began with a 3–1 loss at home to Yeovil Town, when City failed to repeat the heroics of the previous season against the same opposition by coming back from 3–0 down, with just the consolation goal from Jack Sparkes, his first in professional football. The Grecians' second match of the group stage took place at Plymouth's Home Park, where they lost 5–3 on penalties to the Pilgrims after a 2–2 draw. City's elimination was confirmed after a 3–1 loss at home to Chelsea under-21s.

Table

Results

References

Exeter City
Exeter City F.C. seasons